ITAM may refer to:
Instituto Tecnológico Autónomo de México, a private research university located in Mexico City, Mexico
IT asset management
Immunoreceptor tyrosine-based activation motif